Spencer Clay Shiver (born December 7, 1972) is a former American football center in the National Football League (NFL) for the Dallas Cowboys and Carolina Panthers. He played college football at Florida State University, where he was a member of a national championship team and earned All-American honors.

Early years
Shiver was born in Tifton, Georgia.  He attended Tift County High School, where he played football for the Blue Devils, while receiving recognition as a Parade All-America and an All-State selection as a senior.

College career
Shiver accepted a football scholarship to attend Florida State University, where he played for coach Bobby Bowden's Florida State Seminoles football team. In 1992, he shared the starting center role (5 starts) as a redshirt freshman, helping the team to an 11-1 record and an Orange Bowl invitation.

As a sophomore in 1993, he was the snapper for quarterback Charlie Ward and a member of the Seminoles' Bowl Coalition national championship team that defeated the Nebraska Cornhuskers 18–16 in the Orange Bowl. He received his first All-conference selection, while giving up a half of a
quarterback sack in 700 offensive snaps. 

In his junior and senior years, he was awarded the Jacobs Blocking Trophy, presented annually to the best blocker in the ACC. In his last year, he helped the offense averaged 551.5 yards-per-game, ranking third in the nation.

In 2001, he was inducted into the Florida State Athletics Hall of Fame. Bowden called him "the best center that I've coached in 20 years at Florida State."

Professional career

Dallas Cowboys
Shiver was selected by the Dallas Cowboys in the third round (67th overall) of the 1996 NFL draft. As a rookie, he was the backup to Pro Bowler Ray Donaldson and was used at the tight end position in short yardage situations.

In , he replaced Donaldson at center and was the only lineman to start every game at the same position.

Denver Broncos
In , he signed as a free agent with the Denver Broncos, but was waived before the start of the season due to injury.

Carolina Panthers
On December, 14, he was signed by the Carolina Panthers to fill the roster spot left open by the injured Nate Newton, but he did not appear in a regular season game. He was released on August 27, .

Personal life
Shiver is currently a high school football head coach for Boca Raton Christian School.

References

External links
 Florida State Seminoles bio
 Florida State Hall of Fame profile

1972 births
Living people
People from Tifton, Georgia
Players of American football from Georgia (U.S. state)
Florida State Seminoles football players
All-American college football players
American football centers
American football offensive guards
Dallas Cowboys players
Carolina Panthers players